Daniel Sebastian Friend (April 18, 1873 – June 1, 1942) was a Major League Baseball pitcher who pitched for the Chicago Colts (later renamed the Chicago Cubs) of the National League from 1895 through 1898.

Career
Friend was born on April 18, 1873 in Cincinnati.  He made his Major League debut with the Chicago Colts on September 10, 1895 against the New York Giants.  The Colts won his debut by a score of 13–2.  He pitched in five games for the Colts in 1895, starting all five.  He pitched 41 innings and had a won-loss record of 2–2, with an earned run average of 5.27.  His earned run average was slightly worse than league average.

Friend was the Colts' Opening Day starting pitcher in 1896.  Friend had his best season in 1896.  He pitched in 36 games, starting 33.  He had 290 innings pitched, an 18–14 won–lost record, and an earned run average of 4.74, again slightly worse than league average.  In 1897, Friend had another big season in which he pitched in 24 games, starting all 24.  He pitched 203 innings with a 12–11 won–lost record, and an earned run average of 4.52, again slightly worse than league average.

Friend's final Major League season was in 1898.  He pitched in only two games for the Colts, losing both with an earned run average of 5.29.  However, he did have a minor league career that extended until 1908.  In the minors, he pitched for the Providence Grays in 1901 and 1902, the Peoria Distillers in 1903, the New Bedford Whalers from 1904 through 1906, and the Independence Champs in 1907.  In 1908, he pitched for three minor league teams: the Columbia Gamecocks, the Norfolk Tars and the Lynchburg Shoemakers.

For his Major League career, Friend pitched in 67 games and 551 innings, with an earned run average of 4.71 and a won–lost record of 32–29.  As a hitter, he had a career batting average of .256, a career slugging percentage of .283 and a career on-base percentage of .332 in 238 at bats.  Friend died on June 1, 1942 in Chillicothe, Ohio.

References

External links

1873 births
1942 deaths
Major League Baseball pitchers
Chicago Colts players
Chicago Orphans players
19th-century baseball players
Cedar Rapids (minor league baseball) players
Aurora (minor league baseball) players
Dubuque (minor league baseball) players
Oconto (minor league baseball) players
Green Bay (minor league baseball) players
Chattanooga Chatts players
Atlanta Firecrackers players
Bay City Riders players
New Bedford Whalers (baseball) players
Kansas City Blues (baseball) players
Columbus Buckeyes (minor league) players
Columbus Senators players
Milwaukee Brewers (minor league) players
Milwaukee Creams players
Minneapolis Millers (baseball) players
Providence Clamdiggers (baseball) players
Providence Grays (minor league) players
Peoria Distillers players
Independence Champs players
Columbia Gamecocks players
Norfolk Tars players
Lynchburg Shoemakers players
Baseball players from Cincinnati